Aquinas Tawiah Quansah (born 4 April 1964) is a Ghanaian politician and a former member of the Parliament of Ghana and deputy Central Regional Minister of Ghana. He was appointed by President John Evan Atta Mills and served till January 2013.

Early years and education 
Quansah was born on 4 April 1964 in Saltpond, Central Region. He attended the Almeda College in Atlanta, USA and graduated with a bachelor's degree in Business Administration.

Politics 
Quansah was the former member of parliament for the Mfantseman constituency in the Central Region of Ghana. He contested for the Mfantseman constituency seat in the 2012 General Elections and won. He garnered 31,837 votes, which represented 50.95% of the total votes cast and hence defeated the other contestants including Stephen Asamoah Boateng,  Eugene Kwaninaabaka Baiden, Onaventure William Appiah and Veronica Esi Adu-Boateng. However, in 2016, he lost the National Democratic Congress nomination and so did not get the chance to represent the party in the 2016 General Elections. He was the MP for Mfantseman West following the 2008 Ghanaian general election.

Personal life 
Quansah is a Christian who fellowships at the Harvest Chapel International. He is married with two children.

References

Living people
People from Central Region (Ghana)
1964 births
Ghanaian MPs 2009–2013
Ghanaian MPs 2013–2017